Francis Charter was an American politician who served two terms in the Michigan House of Representatives.

Biography 

Francis Charter was elected supervisor of LaSalle Township, Michigan, in 1830 and each succeeding year through 1835.
He was elected to the Michigan House of Representatives as a representative from Monroe County and served in the 1st Michigan Legislature from 1835 through 1836, and was re-elected to a term in 1838.

Notes

References 
 
 
 

19th-century American politicians
Members of the Michigan House of Representatives